Vladimirci is a village and municipality located in the Mačva District of western Serbia. According to the 2011 census results, the population of the village is 1,662, while population of the municipality is 17,462.

Name
The name of the settlement in Serbian is plural.

History
On 11 December 1924, King of Yugoslavia Alexander I declared Vladimirci a municipality.

Settlements
Aside from the village of Vladimirci, the municipality includes the following settlements:

Belotić
Beljin
Bobovik
Debrc
Dragojevac
Jazovnik
Jalovik
Kaona
Kozarica
Krnić
Krnule
Kujavica
Lojanice
Matijevac
Mesarci
Mehovine
Mrovska
Novo Selo
Pejinović
Provo
Riđake
Skupljen
Suvo Selo
Trbušac
Vlasenica
Vukošić
Vučevica
Zvezd

Demographics

According to the 2011 census results, the municipality of Vladimirci has 17,462 inhabitants.

Ethnic groups
The ethnic composition of the municipality:

Economy
The following table gives a preview of total number of employed people per their core activity (as of 2017):

Gallery

See also
 List of places in Serbia

References

External links 

 Municipality of Vladimirci

Populated places in Mačva District
Municipalities and cities of Šumadija and Western Serbia